Şiyəkəran (also, Sheakeran, Shikhakeran, Shirakeran’, and Shiyakeran) is a village and municipality in the Astara Rayon of Azerbaijan.  It has a population of 4,789.

References 

Populated places in Astara District